Gabon competed at the 2022 World Aquatics Championships in Budapest, Hungary from 18 June to 3 July.

Swimming

Gabonese swimmers have achieved qualifying standards in the following events.

References

Nations at the 2022 World Aquatics Championships
Gabon at the World Aquatics Championships
World Aquatics Championships